Gayatri Mahima is a 1977 Bollywood  directed by Harsukh Jagneshwar Bhatt.

Cast
Bharat Bhushan   
Jayshree Gadkar   
Ashish Kumar (actor)   
Jaya Kausalya   
Chandrashekhar   
Padma Khanna   
Tun Tun   
Abhi Bhattacharya   
D.K. Sapru
Master Alankar

Soundtrack
"Gayatri Ke Mahamantra Se Jivan Ke Sab Paap Haro" - Manna Dey
"Anand Mangal Karu Aarti Jai Gayatri Mata" - Mukesh
"Deepak Hai Tu Piya Mai Teri Jyoti" - Asha Bhosle, Mohammed Rafi
"Saanchi Ho Lagan Jo Mann Me, Dukh Dard Mite Jo Pal Chhin Me" - Mohammed Rafi
"O Maa Teri Mamta" - Lata Mangeshkar
"Sajna O Sajna" - Usha Mangeshkar

External links
 

1977 films
1970s Hindi-language films
Films scored by Chitragupta
1970s fantasy films
Indian fantasy films